Juli Inkster (born Juli Simpson; June 24, 1960) is an American professional golfer who plays on the LPGA Tour. With a professional career spanning 29 years to date, Inkster's 31 wins rank her second in wins among all active players on the LPGA Tour; she has over $14 million in career earnings. She also has more wins in Solheim Cup matches than any other American, and is a member of the World Golf Hall of Fame. Inkster is the only golfer in LPGA Tour history to win two majors in a decade for three consecutive decades by winning three in the 1980s, two in the 1990s, and two in the 2000s.

Amateur career
Born and raised in Santa Cruz, California, Simpson graduated from Harbor High School in 1978 and played college golf at nearby San Jose State, where she was an All-American in 1979, 1981, and 1982. She was also All Nor-Cal 1979–1981 and SJSU Athlete of the Year in 1981, and is a member of the San Jose State Sports Hall of Fame. From 1980 to 1982, Inkster won three consecutive U.S. Women's Amateurs, her first victory coming three weeks after her marriage to Brian Inkster. She became the first woman since 1934 to win three consecutive U.S. Amateur titles.

She was a member of the winning U.S. Curtis Cup team in 1982. She was also a member of the winning U.S. team at the Espirito Santo Trophy in 1980 and 1982.

She won the 1981 California State Amateur Championship, was California’s 1981 Amateur of the Year, and 1982 Bay Area Athlete of the Year. She won the Broderick Award, (now the Honda Sports Award) as the nation's best female collegiate golfer in 1982.

Professional career
She turned professional and enjoyed success in her rookie year of 1983 with a victory at the Safeco Classic. She won two major championships in 1984, her first full LPGA season, and was LPGA Rookie of the Year. She has won 31 tournaments on the LPGA Tour, including seven majors and the career Grand Slam for ladies' golf.  she is fifth on the LPGA career money list. Inkster won a tournament in 16 out of 24 seasons from 1983 to 2006, but has never finished at the top of the money list; her best finishes were second in 1999, and third in both 1986 and 2002.

Inkster played on the United States Solheim Cup team in 1992, 1998, 2000, 2002, 2003, 2005, 2007, 2009, and 2011; she has won a total of 18.5 points, making her the winningest American Solheim Cup player as of 2011. She teamed with Pat Hurst, represented the United States at the 2007 Women's World Cup of Golf. She was voted Women's Sports Foundation Sportswoman of the Year in 1999 and was inducted into the World Golf Hall of Fame in 2000. She was recognized during the LPGA’s 50th Anniversary in 2000 as one of the LPGA’s top-50 players and teachers.

Inkster was a player and assistant captain on the 2011 Solheim Cup team. She was the oldest player and the first playing assistant captain in Solheim Cup history.

In  late 2011 at age 51, Inkster suffered the first major injury of her career, necessitating surgery in January 2012 to repair nerve and tendon damage in her right elbow. The surgery kept her out of the 2012 season until late June.

Solheim Cup captaincy
Inkster was the captain for the United States team in the 2015 Solheim Cup. The United States started the final day down 10–6, but mounted a historic comeback to capture the victory by a final score of 14.5–13.5. Inkster captained the United States team again in the 2017 Solheim Cup set at the Des Moines Golf and Country Club in West Des Moines, Iowa, which the team won 16.5-11.5. On January 31, 2018, it was announced that Inkster would captain the United States team for a third consecutive match in 2019 at Gleneagles. Europe won the match against United States 14.5–13.5.

Senior career
Inkster has won four tournaments in the Legends Tour and finished second in the 2018 U.S. Senior Women's Open.

Broadcast career
In 2014, Inkster began a career as a golf commentator for the Golf Channel, gaining experience as both interviewer and analyst. In 2015, she joined Fox Sports to serve as commentator for that network's coverage of USGA events.

Professional wins (45)

LPGA Tour wins (31)

LPGA Tour playoff record (6–4)

Ladies European Tour wins (2)
2000 Compaq Open
2003 Evian Masters (co-sanctioned with LPGA Tour)

Other wins (7)
1986 JCPenney Classic (with Tom Purtzer)
1990 Spalding Invitational
1996 Diners Club Matches (with Dottie Pepper)
1997 Diners Club Matches (with Dottie Pepper), Gillette Tour Challenge (with Rosie Jones)
1999 Diners Club Matches (with Dottie Pepper)
2000 Hyundai Team Matches (with Dottie Pepper)

Legends Tour wins (6)
2015 Legends Championship
2016 Walgreens Charity Classic, Walgreens Charity Championship
2017 Walgreens Charity Classic
2019 Suquamish Clearwater Legends Cup
2021 Land O'Lakes Legends Classic

Major championships

Wins (7)

1 Defeated Bradley on the first hole of a sudden-death playoff 
2 Defeated Croce on the second hole of a sudden-death playoff

Results timeline
Results not in chronological order before 2019.

^ The Women's British Open replaced the du Maurier Classic as an LPGA major in 2001.
^^ The Evian Championship was added as a major in 2013.

CUT = missed the half-way cut.
DQ = disqualified
NT = no tournament
T = tied

Summary

Most consecutive cuts made – 16 (twice)
Longest streak of top-10s – 4 (twice)

LPGA Tour career summary

 official as of 2022 season
* Includes match play and other events without a cut.

U.S. national team appearances
Amateur
Curtis Cup: 1982 (winners)
Espirito Santo Trophy: 1980 (winners), 1982 (winners)

Professional
Solheim Cup: 1992, 1998 (winners), 2000, 2002 (winners), 2003, 2005 (winners), 2007 (winners), 2009 (winners), 2011, 2015 Solheim Cup (non-playing captain, winners), 2017 Solheim Cup (non-playing captain, winners), 2019 Solheim Cup (non-playing captain)
World Cup: 2007, 2008
Handa Cup: 2014 (winners), 2015 (winners)

Solheim Cup record

Awards
1982: Broderick Award for Golf
1984: LPGA Rookie of the Year
1989: GWAA Female Player of the Year
1999: Women's Sports Foundation Sportswoman of the Year
2000: ESPY Awards Best Female Golfer
2004: LPGA William and Mousie Powell Award
2009: ASAPSports/Jim Murray Award
2009: LPGA Patty Berg Award
2022: Bob Jones Award

See also
List of female golfers
List of golfers with most LPGA Tour wins
List of golfers with most LPGA major championship wins
Women's Career Grand Slam winners

Notes and references

External links

American female golfers
San Jose State Spartans women's golfers
LPGA Tour golfers
Winners of ladies' major amateur golf championships
Winners of LPGA major golf championships
Solheim Cup competitors for the United States
World Golf Hall of Fame inductees
Golfers from California
People from Los Altos, California
Sportspeople from Santa Cruz, California
Golf writers and broadcasters
Women sports announcers
1960 births
Living people